Victor Griffin may refer to:

Victor Griffin (Quapaw) (1873–1958), chief, interpreter, and peyote roadman
Victor Griffin (1924–2017), reverend and author